Angela Romero is an American politician and the Democratic leader of the Utah House of Representatives representing the 25th District since January 1, 2023. Prior to redistricting, she represented the 26th District since January 1, 2013.

Early life and education
Romero was born and raised in Tooele, Utah. She is Chicana and Assiniboine. She attended the University of Utah where she earned a bachelor's degree in political science and later a master's degree in public administration.

Political career
Romero was first elected in November 2012. During the 2016 legislative session, she served on the Executive Offices and Criminal Justice Appropriations Subcommittee, the House Economic Development and Workforce Services Committee, the House Ethics Committee, the House Law Enforcement and Criminal Justice Committee, and the House Public Utilities, Energy and Technology Interim Committee, Native American Legislative Liaison Committee.

NHCSL leadership 
On February 26, 2018, Romero was elected First Vice President of the National Hispanic Caucus of State Legislators (NHCSL). And, in March 2022, she was elected President Elect of the NHCSL for a two-year term, expected to be followed by service as President for the 2024-25 term.

As part of that NHCSL leadership role, Romero represented Utah in several meetings and events at the White House. She met with Vice President Kamala Harris, on Hispanic policy priorities in March 25, 2022. They met again on August 5, 2022 to discuss fighting for abortion rights. And, Romero participated in the signing ceremony of the Respect for Marriage Act on December 13, 2022.

House minority leader 
On November 22, 2022, Romero was elected Minority Leader for the 2023-24 term, succeeding Brian King. Romero's leadership team became the first all-women leadership team (of a minority or majority party) in the Utah House of Representatives, joining the also first-ever all-women Utah Senate Democratic leadership team elected 12 days earlier. At the same time, Romero joined Luz_Escamilla in becoming the first Latinas to be elected Minority Leaders in the Utah Legislature.

2016 sponsored legislation

Romero passed four of the six bills she proposed, giving her a 66% passage rate. She did not floor sponsor any legislation during 2016.

Elections
2014 Romero was unopposed in the Democratic convention. She faced Republican nominee Spencer Barclay in the general election, where she won with 2,977 votes (72.8%).
2012 When District 26 incumbent Democratic Representative David Litvack left the Legislature and left the seat open, Romero was chosen by the Democratic convention over appointed incumbent Brian Doughty, who had been redistricted from District 30, and won the three-way November 6, 2012 general election with 4,926 votes (65.4%) against Republican nominee Andres Paredes and Green candidate Mark Dee Whitaker.

Personal life
Romero and her son, Cio, live in the Glendale neighborhood where she also works as the Community Programs Manager for the Sorenson Unity Center. She is a Catholic.

References

External links
 Official page at the Utah State Legislature
 Campaign site
 Angela Romero at Ballotpedia
 Angela Romero at the National Institute on Money in State Politics

Living people
21st-century American politicians
21st-century American women politicians
21st-century Native Americans
American politicians of Mexican descent
American women lawyers
Assiniboine people
Catholics from Utah
Hispanic and Latino American state legislators
Hispanic and Latino American women in politics
Democratic Party members of the Utah House of Representatives
Native American Roman Catholics
Native American state legislators
Native American women in politics
People from Tooele, Utah
Politicians from Salt Lake City
University of Utah alumni
Utah lawyers
Women state legislators in Utah
Year of birth missing (living people)
21st-century Native American women
Native American people from Utah